Pashan Test Range is an out-door testing and evaluating facility of Armament Research and Development Establishment for armament stores.

It is located in outskirt of Pune near Pashan village and is spread over 150 acres of land surrounded by hills on three sides.

The facilities at Pasan Test Range include the following:
Small arms firing up to 1,000-m range
Velocity measurement tunnel up to 100 m
Sand butt tunnel for firing of high-calibre guns
Leaning tower for aircraft seat ejection studies
Environment testing for life assessment of armament stores
High-speed photography and video recording
Photometric tunnel for measuring luminosity of illuminating store
30-m para-drop tower
Since Pashan Test Range is located in the vicinity of a metropolitan city, it a limited trial facility and full range trial cannot be conducted here

See also
Chitradurga Aeronautical Test Range
Ramgarh Test Range
Tandur Test Range

External links
http://www.thehindu.com/education/careers/firepower-for-the-armed-forces/article3999110.ece

References

Ministry of Defence (India)
Defence Research and Development Organisation
Military installations of India
Weapons test sites